Smart rocks was a part of Ronald Reagan's Strategic Defense Initiative, also known as the "Star Wars Program", after a speech he gave in March 1983.

History 
The idea used gravity to drop or shoot weapons downward than to fight gravity launching upwards. With this approach they began looking into different methods to achieve this kind of defense. Edward Teller's approach was to use X-ray lasers powered by nuclear explosions that, "...would have produced a burst of powerful laser rays that, if aimed properly, could destroy a large number of targets with a single weapon." Unfortunately after underground tests this method proved impractical. With Teller's plan being a bust they moved on to kinetic based devices.

This concept would be called Smart Rock and was promoted by General Daniel O Graham as part of a multi-layered defense shield. He proposed that, "...heat-seeking space-based weapons to hit Soviet missiles in their boost phase when they are emitting huge amounts of infrared energy and before they can deploy decoys." Smart Rocks was advantageous as it was based in low Earth orbit making it a hard target with conventional weapons, could be shielded against electromagnetic pulse, had no vulnerable radar, and required less fuel than lasers. This program would evolve into "Brilliant Pebbles," an anti ballistic missile system that would be the foundation of President George H.W. Bush's Global Protection Against Limited Strikes (GPALS) system. Ultimately this program would be shut down in the beginning of President Bill Clinton's administration who would focus mainly on ground based deterrence.

Problems 
While the Smart Rocks defensive system was promoted by Graham and brought into planning by President Bush the system was not without problems. Namely, the system is more expensive to put into use than the enemy's ability to avoid or destroy it. Graham suggested, "...space-based platforms containing 40 to 50 defensive units of guided missiles and a few manned space-based units that would coordinate and control the defensive devices housed in the platforms." With this combination of space-based and ground-based units it would be too expensive to maintain and deploy. Both platforms and units would be obvious to the enemy making it easy for them to shoot the Smart Rocks down.

Adaption 
The Smart Rocks program, renamed to Brilliant Pebbles under President Bush, would be formally adopted by the Pentagon in 1992 with a plan to deploy in 1996.

Cost 
To protect the entire northern hemisphere with enough Brilliant Pebbles was estimated to cost $2 billion, with an additional $1 billion to get them into orbit. In the estimate by the Pentagon they would note that, "...there would be $8 billion in other, largely administrative, costs to develop and deploy Brilliant Pebbles, operate the system for 10 years following its deployment, and then decommission it." Making the project overall very expensive to deploy and maintain.

References 

Strategic Defense Initiative